Vincent Schlenker (born December 17, 1992) is a German professional ice hockey player. He is currently playing for the Eisbären Berlin (Berlin Polar Bears) in the Deutsche Eishockey Liga (German Ice Hockey League).

References

External links
 

1992 births
Living people
Eisbären Berlin players
German ice hockey forwards
People from Villingen-Schwenningen
Sportspeople from Freiburg (region)